Joseph Philip Branch (born November 6, 1932) was a Canadian football player who played for the Saskatchewan Roughriders.

References

1932 births
Living people
Saskatchewan Roughriders players
Canadian football guards